Middle Prong Wilderness was designated in 1984 and it covers  within the Pisgah National Forest in Haywood County, Western North Carolina.  The Wilderness Area spans steep, rugged high-elevation ridges ranging from 3,200 to over 6,400 feet, and the area gets its name from the Middle Prong of the Pigeon River finding whose headwaters are located in the area.  NC 215 separates from Shining Rock Wilderness to the northeast.

See also
 List of U.S. Wilderness Areas
 Wilderness Act

References

External links
 Middle Prong Wilderness, Wilderness.net website

Protected areas of the Appalachians
Protected areas of Haywood County, North Carolina
IUCN Category Ib
Pisgah National Forest
Protected areas established in 1984
Wilderness areas of North Carolina